Fright Night is a 1985 American supernatural horror film written and directed by Tom Holland (in his directorial debut) and produced by Herb Jaffe. It stars Chris Sarandon, William Ragsdale, Roddy McDowall, Amanda Bearse, Jonathan Stark, Dorothy Fielding, Stephen Geoffreys, and Art Evans. The film follows young Charley Brewster, who discovers that his next-door neighbor Jerry Dandrige is a vampire. When no one believes him, Charley decides to get Peter Vincent, a TV show host who acted in films as a vampire hunter, to stop Jerry's killing spree.

The film was released on August 2, 1985, and grossed $24.9 million at the box office. Since its release, it has received positive reviews from critics and has become a cult classic. Fright Night was followed by a sequel, Fright Night Part 2, in 1988, and a remake in 2011, which was in turn followed by Fright Night 2: New Blood in 2013. In October 2020, Tom Holland confirmed that he was writing a direct sequel to the original film titled Fright Night: Resurrection that would bring back characters from the original film and would ignore the 1988 sequel.

Plot
Seventeen-year-old Charley Brewster is a fan of a horror television program called Fright Night, hosted by former movie vampire hunter Peter Vincent. One evening, Charley discovers that his new next-door neighbor Jerry Dandrige is a vampire responsible for the disappearances of several victims. After telling his mother, Charley asks his girlfriend, Amy Peterson, and his friend, "Evil Ed" Thompson, for help before contacting the authorities. Detective Lennox goes with Charley to Jerry's house to question him, but his "roommate" Billy Cole tells them that Jerry is "away on business". Charley reveals his suspicions about Jerry's vampirism, and Lennox leaves, furious. That night, Charley is shocked to see Jerry inside his house, having been invited in by Charley's mother. Later, Jerry visits Charley and offers him a choice: ignore his vampiric activities, or else. Charley refuses, brandishing a crucifix at Jerry. When Jerry tries to push him out the window to his death, Charley stabs Jerry's hand with a pencil. Jerry destroys Charley's car in retaliation and threatens Charley over the telephone.

Charley turns to Peter Vincent for help, but Peter dismisses Charley as an obsessed fan. Amy, fearing for Charley's sanity and safety, hires the destitute Peter to "prove" that Jerry is not a vampire by having him drink what they claim is "holy water", but it is only tap water; Jerry has claimed to Peter that drinking actual holy water would be against his religious convictions. Peter discovers Charley is right about Jerry's true nature after glancing at his pocket mirror and noticing Jerry's lack of a reflection, causing him to accidentally drop the mirror; Peter then flees, but Jerry learns of his discovery after finding a shard of mirrored glass on the floor.

Jerry hunts down Ed and turns him into a vampire, then Ed proceeds to visit Peter and tries to attack him, only to be warded off when burned by a crucifix to the forehead. Meanwhile, Jerry chases Charley and Amy into a nightclub. While Charley tries to call the police, Jerry hypnotizes and abducts Amy, who resembles Jerry's lost love, and bites her. With nowhere left to turn, Charley attempts to gain Peter's help once more. A frightened Peter initially refuses, but then reluctantly resumes his "vampire killer" role. Entering Jerry's house, the two are able to repel Jerry using a crucifix, though only Charley's works since he has faith in its spiritual power. Billy appears and knocks Charley over the banister, while Peter flees to Charley's house. There, he is surprised by Ed, who attacks him in the form of a wolf, only to be pierced through the heart with a broken table leg held by Peter. Removing the stake from Ed's body, Peter goes to rescue Charley and battle Jerry.

Charley is locked in with Amy, who is slowly transforming into a vampire. Peter frees him before she awakens, and says the process can be reversed if they destroy Jerry before dawn. Billy confronts Charley and Peter, and is revealed to be undead. They destroy Billy, who melts into goo and sand. Peter is able to lure the overconfident Jerry in front of a window using a crucifix, which now works due to his renewed faith in its abilities. As the sun rises, Jerry transforms into a bat and attacks Peter and Charley before fleeing to his coffin in the basement. Charley and Peter pursue Jerry; the latter breaks open Jerry's coffin and tries to stake him through the heart while Charley fights off Amy, who has almost completed her transformation. By breaking the blacked-out windows in the basement, Peter and Charley expose Jerry to the sunlight, destroying him and returning Amy to her human form.

A few nights later, Peter returns to his Fright Night TV series and announces a hiatus from vampires, presenting a film about alien invaders instead. Charley and Amy watch the program as they embrace in bed. Charley gets up to turn off the TV and glimpses red eyes in Jerry's now-vacant house, but dismisses them. Unbeknownst to both Charley and Amy, a new neighbor has just moved in.

Cast
 Chris Sarandon as Jerry Dandrige 
 William Ragsdale as Charley Brewster
 Amanda Bearse as Amy Peterson
 Stephen Geoffreys as Edward "Evil Ed" Thompson
 Jonathan Stark as Billy Cole
 Dorothy Fielding as Judy Brewster
 Art J. Evans as Detective Lennox
 Roddy McDowall as Peter Vincent
 Stewart Stern as Cook

Nick Savage and Ernie Holmes portray the bouncers killed by Jerry. Playboy Playmate Heidi Sorenson also appears as one of Jerry's victims.

Production

Development
While writing the script for Cloak & Dagger, Tom Holland amused himself when he conceived the idea of a horror-movie fan becoming convinced that his next-door neighbor was a vampire, but he did not initially think this premise was enough to sustain a story. "What's he gonna do", Holland asked, "because everybody's gonna think he's mad!" The story percolated in his mind for a year and finally one day while discussing it with John Byers, then the head of story department at Columbia Pictures, he finally figured out what the boy would do. "Of course, he's gonna go to Vincent Price!" In that era, many local TV stations in the United States had horror hosts (such as Zacherle, Svengoolie, and the nationally syndicated Elvira), so Holland decided it would be natural for the boy to seek aid from his local host. "The minute I had Peter Vincent, I had the story. Charley Brewster was the engine, but Peter Vincent was the heart." Once he'd conceived that character, Holland knocked out the first draft of the script in three weeks. "And I was laughing the entire time, literally on the floor, kicking my feet in the air in hysterics."

Holland wrote the film for himself to direct, in part because he was so disheartened by the film that was ultimately made from his previous screenplay, Scream for Help, and he had developed enough clout from the successes of his screenplays for Class of 1984, Psycho II, and Cloak & Dagger that the head of Columbia Pictures said, "Let's take a chance on the hot screenwriter kid", not figuring that Fright Night would be as successful as it ultimately became.

Casting
The Peter Vincent character was named after horror icons Peter Cushing and Vincent Price, and Holland specifically wrote the part for Price, but at this point in his career, Price had been so badly typecast that he had stopped accepting roles in horror movies. Guy McElwaine, then the head of Columbia Pictures, suggested Roddy McDowall for the part. McDowall had already starred in the Holland-penned film Class of 1984, so Holland was immediately receptive to the suggestion. "He understood the part", commented Holland, "and he also understood what he could do with it, and he really wanted it!" McDowall was particularly interested in the genesis of the character. "In the film, I perform as being in my late 20s or early 30s in the film clips of my old movies-all the way up to my 60s, when I'm the washed-up has-been", McDowall adding that the role interested him because, "I'd never played anything that old." Holland and McDowall built a lasting friendship, and McDowall eventually invited Holland to a dinner party where he introduced him to Vincent Price, who was flattered that the part was an homage to him and commented that the film "was wonderful and he thought Roddy did a wonderful job."

Chris Sarandon's agent gave him a copy of the script and he replied, "there's no way I can do a horror movie," but he decided to give the script a once-over and was immediately captivated by it. "I thought this is one of the best scripts I've read in a long time", Sarandon said, "beautifully constructed, it was obvious that this was a labor of love, it was clear that the writer/director's approach to it was one of wanting to have fun with the genre without making fun of it, the characters were beautifully drawn." Sarandon was worried about being typecast as a villain, but the script resonated with him because the story was deeper than just an average monster movie. "Forgetting about vampirism, what this film is about on one level is an older man trying to take a younger man's girl away from him", commented Holland. Although he liked the screenplay, Sarandon was still leery of working with a first-time director, so he flew to Los Angeles to meet Tom Holland and producer Herb Jaffe. Holland and he had an immediate rapport (and went on to make several more films together), and Sarandon was awed that Holland had the film so completely mapped out that he "literally described the movie shot-by-shot all the way through – page-by-page, scene-by-scene. It was basically the way he shot it."

Jonathan Stark was not a fan of vampire films, but he also liked the script. The Billy Cole character was written as a hulking giant, so Stark padded himself with extra clothing when he went in to audition. At auditions, he read the scene in which he is being questioned by the detective, which was written to be played straight. "I'm thinking if I'm sitting there being evil", Stark commented, "the lieutenant's gonna get suspicious. Why not throw him off the trail by being funny?" Holland liked his take on the character, and Stark was told that he had the part – but because he came in to read at the start of the audition process, months passed before filming commenced and Stark worried that he had lost the role. The gap worked to his advantage, however, because it gave him time to hit the gym and bulk up so he would not have to wear padding in the film.

William Ragsdale had auditioned to portray Rocky Dennis in Mask, but he lost the role to Eric Stoltz. Casting director Jackie Burch remembered his audition though, and thought he would be right to portray Charley Brewster. Ragsdale auditioned several times and ultimately received the news that he had landed the part on Halloween night 1984, beating out several other future-stars like Charlie Sheen.

Due to a mix-up, Stephen Geoffreys had an awkward audition for Anthony Michael Hall's role in Weird Science, and he made an indelible impression on Jackie Burch, who suggested him for Fright Night. Although he was not a horror-movie fan, Geoffreys loved the script, so he called his agent and emphatically declared that he would love to audition for Charley Brewster. "No, Steve", his agent replied, "you're wanted for the part of Evil Ed." Geoffreys was simultaneously baffled and heartbroken. "What do they see in me that they think I should be this... well anyway, it worked out."

The most difficult role to cast was Amy Peterson. "There wasn't the perfect girl next door until Amanda Bearse walked in", Holland commented.

Pre-production
Once his cast was in place, Holland got input from each of the actors and made numerous revisions to the script. Some were slight and others were major – such as the ending, which originally featured Peter Vincent transforming into a vampire as he returned to host Fright Night. The September 6, 1984, draft of the screenplay, which is circulating online, is very close to the final cut of the film, but a few more changes were still to come.

The cast and crew were given the luxury of having two weeks of rehearsal time in late November 1984 prior to filming. Holland blocked out the scenes on a soundstage and the cast performed the entire film like it was a stage play. Having begun his career as a classically trained actor, Holland encouraged the cast to write biographies of their characters so they would completely understand their motivations and be able to draw on that information while filming their scenes. All of the kinks in the story/performances were ironed out during the rehearsal period, so when time to film came, Holland only shot two or three takes of each scene and then moved on.

As originally written, Jerry Dandrige was more villainous, so Sarandon tried to find various ways to humanize the vampire, including suggesting the implication that the Amy character was the reincarnation of his long-lost love. "I wanted to give the audience something to hold onto in terms of understanding that this was someone who was at one time--and still is, in certain respects--a thinking, feeling human being", Sarandon said. "This is a man who has been hunted for all his post-human existence, but who has fallen in love a number of times, and who in a sense, longs for a normal existence." Sarandon also did research into bats and discovered that most of the world's bat populations are frugivores, so he concluded, "Jerry had a lot of fruit bat in his DNA." This explains why his character is frequently munching on apples, which Sarandon decided his character was using to "cleanse his palate" after draining blood from his victims.

Stark and Sarandon had not picked up on Holland's intended gay subtext when they were developing their characters. "I didn't have any sense of it as being anything other than Renfield and Dracula", Chris Sarandon recalled. "I think there was sort of an asexual quality to the relationship that was sort of borderline homoerotic but not in the sense that it was creepy." For the scene in which Jerry pulls down the window shade and it looks as though Billy is about to perform oral sex on him, Stark remembered, "I'm cleaning his hand and [Tom Holland] said, 'No, get down on your knees.' 'Okay, Tom.' Then when I saw [the film], I thought, 'Oooooh, okay.'"

McDowall also did a lot of work on his character, and made a conscious decision to pattern his performance after the Cowardly Lion in The Wizard of Oz. "My part is that of an old ham actor, I mean a dreadful actor. He realizes it but doesn't admit it. He had a moderate success in an isolated film here and there, but all very bad product. This poor sonofabitch just played the same character all the time, which was awful. And then he disappeared from sight, 15 years beforehand. He's been peddling these movies to late night TV, various syndicated markets – he'd go six months in Iowa, six months in Podunk." McDowall commented to Fangoria, "He's got such a sad life, he's sort of cowardly and then he finds his strength as a human being." Despite the pathetic character he was portraying, McDowall was a pillar for the cast and crew. "He was a kind of Yoda on the set", commented Sarandon. Recalled Ragsdale, "He had his videocamera on his shoulder and he was shooting, like, family movies the whole time."

Sarandon recalled that Holland collaborated with choreographer Dorain Grusman in shooting a disco dance scene to have Bearse's character physically changing so that "she goes from this rather dewey, innocent-looking girl to this femme fatale; she kind of grows up right before your eyes." The scene also established Amy discovering Jerry actually was a vampire.

Filming
Principal photography commenced on December 3, 1984, and wrapped on February 23, 1985. At the time of production, Fright Night was Columbia's lowest-budgeted film and they did not have high expectations for it, so they were focusing all of their attention on the John Travolta/Jamie Lee Curtis film Perfect, which they were certain was going to be a blockbuster. "They never even came to the set", Holland said. "I was left alone. It was totally my film without studio interference."

Generally, filming went off without a hitch, but a few mishaps did occur, including an incident in which Ragsdale broke his ankle while running down a staircase. The schedule had to be reorganized, but filming continued. "Nobody panicked. In fact, I think that the thing I'll remember most about this movie is everyone's spirit and humor." The cast and crew seemed to meld with a singular vision of making the best movie possible. Early in production, Holland invited Fangoria writer Abbie Bernstein to visit the set as often as she liked, and she took him up on his offer. Of the wrap party in March, Bernstein wrote, "It's fun and pleasant, but it lacks the intense camaraderie of the set."

Make-up and visual effects
Richard Edlund was the head of visual effects, and his team had just completed work on Ghostbusters, which worked to the advantage of Fright Night. "They had made all of their mistakes with how to do the matte shots and everything on Ghostbusters, with their huge budget", Holland commented, "so they really knew how to do [the special effects] as inexpensively and efficiently as it could be done at the time."

The most excruciating part of the makeup process for the cast was the contact lenses. In those days, the lenses were hard plastic, which Steve Johnson hand-painted (throwing some glitter into the mix), lacquered, and sanded. The cast could only wear them for a maximum of 20 minutes because they were virtually blind in them, and they were thick and painful, and dried out their eyes. A set was made for Stark to wear when he was in his final pursuit of Peter and Charley, but he kept tripping on the stairs. Holland told him to take one out, and he was then able to perform the scene. Three sets were made for Amanda Bearse, but one of them caused her agonizing pain, which she initially tried to endure. When it finally became too much to bear, she took the contacts out and the crew realized they had forgotten to buff them. For the scene in Mrs. Brewster's bedroom, Geoffreys kept his contacts in for nearly 40 minutes, resulting in scratches on his eyeballs for months afterward.

For the transformation sequences, up to 8 hours were needed to prepare Sarandon's makeup. Sarandon was uncomfortable spending that long sitting in a chair doing nothing, and since he had experience doing his own makeup for his work on the stage, he volunteered to help. He did some of the stippling, and while the makeup men were applying prosthetics to his face and head, he worked on the finger extensions. Sarandon has often joked that the rubber fingers caused difficulties whenever he had to urinate, so costume supervisor Mort Schwartz constantly offered to help him. "I said to Morry, 'Thank you, no, I'll just use a coat hanger!'" Co-star Ragsdale recalled one instance when Sarandon spent an entire day in the makeup chair, and when he was finally fully transformed into the monster, a producer informed him that they were not going to be able to shoot the scene that day. "And Chris said, 'Okay,' and turned around and went and took it off, it was amazing!" Ragsdale exclaimed. "I would have gone through the roof, but he didn't. His will had been broken by that point!"

The makeup for Evil Ed's wolf transformation took 18 hours. While he had the wolf head on, the crew began pouring what they thought was methylcellulose into his mouth to create the illusion of saliva, but when Geoffreys began to complain about the taste, Mark Bryan Wilson realized they had been using prosthetic adhesive, which was gluing his mouth shut.

On Christmas Eve, during the shooting of a scene where he is running down a staircase, Ragsdale accidentally tripped and broke his ankle, resulting in the film being temporarily put on a hold until he could recover. "Rod Martin, a trainer for the Los Angeles Raiders, came in every day to wrap the foot for me, and the shooting schedule was rearranged to put off the action sequences until it mended." said Ragsdale. Many scenes were shot with his foot in a cast, including the scene in which Jerry comes to Charley's room to attack him. For shots in which Charley's feet were visible, the costumers slit Ragsdale's shoes in several places, slipped them on and then covered the portions of white cast that peeked through the slits with black cloth. For the scene in which Jerry is carrying Charley by the throat with one hand, Sarandon was simultaneously pushing Ragsdale along on a furniture dolly.

The shot of Jerry pulling the pencil out of his hand was achieved by having a spring-loaded, collapsible pencil glued to his palm and an eraser-tip loosely attached to the back of his hand. When he turns his hand and pulls the spring-loaded piece from his palm, out of shot a monofilament wire jerked away the tip, so when he turns it back, it appears as though he has pulled it straight through his hand. "So we go to the editing room", FX man Steve Johnson recalled of an early cut, "and Tom had put a reaction in the middle of it, ruined the entire shot!"

The crew attempted to achieve the illusion of the cross-scar vanishing from Evil Ed's forehead live on-set, but the effect was a resounding failure. In that predigital age, Edlund's crew was able to alter the film using optical photography to achieve the effect.

Filming of the sequence with the bat was difficult for effects veteran Randall Cook, who kept winding up on film while puppeteering the creature. Further complications ensued when the bat tries to bite Roddy McDowall's character and he forces a bone into its mouth; getting the puppet to bite was difficult, and then McDowall jerked the bone too hard and broke the bat's skull. The bat was quickly patched, but the required repairs forced them to wait two days to shoot more close-ups.

Soundtrack

The original 10-track soundtrack album was released on LP and cassette in 1985 by Private-I Records. A promotional music video for the title song by J. Geils Band was made which used many clips from the film and received minor airplay on MTV. An instrumental version of Brad Fiedel's "Come to Me" was prominently featured throughout the movie, but the version on the album includes lyrics sung by Fiedel; instrumental versions were later issued on the CD with Fiedel's score (a different version which includes an additional verse was recorded by Deborah Holland for the end credits of Fright Night Part 2). The album was officially reissued in December 2016 on CD format by Perseverance Records.

Track listing

Instrumental score

A bootleg of Brad Fiedel's score for the film first surfaced in Japan in 2000. In 2011, Intrada Records officially issued the score on CD.  Since some of the master tapes had gone missing, some of the music was transferred from lower-quality tapes. The limited-edition 2011 Twilight Time Blu-ray also included the complete isolated score.

 "Fright Night" – 15:25 [Medley from the 1/4" 15 i.p.s. Stereo Mixes]
 "Window Watching" – 1:57
 "Jerry Takes Off" – 1:45
 "Drive to Evil and Bat Attack" – 2:07
 "Charlie's Cathedral, Charmed and Alley Bat" – 5:29
 "Evil Visitor" – 01:44
 "Charlie Begs for Help and Come to Me (Seduction Scene)" – 4:38
 "Vampire Killers and Your Dinner's in the Oven" – 9:44
 "Jerry's Time Is Up" – 7:28
 "The Basement" – 5:21
 "You're So Cool Brewster and Come to Me" – 5:44

Release and reception

Box office
Fright Nights widest release was 1,545 theaters. The film made $6,118,543 on opening weekend (1,542 theaters, $3,967 average). The domestic gross came to $24,922,237. It performed the best of any horror film released during the summer of 1985 and was the second-highest grossing horror film of 1985, surpassed only by A Nightmare on Elm Street 2: Freddy's Revenge.

Critical reception

Fright Night garnered critical acclaim, holding an 82% approval rating on Rotten Tomatoes; the average rating is 7.1/10 based on 60 reviews. The site's consensus reads: "Fright Night deftly combines thrills and humor in this ghostly tale about a man living next to a vampire."

Roger Ebert of the Chicago Sun-Times gave the film three stars out of four and wrote, "Fright Night is not a distinguished movie, but it has a lot of fun being undistinguished". Variety praised Sarandon's performance, writing that he "is terrific as the vampire, quite affable and debonair until his fingernails start to grow and his eyes get that glow". Colin Greenland gave a negative review for White Dwarf #75, stating "We may be justified in suspecting that a film which has such contempt for its characters has contempt for its audience, too."

Accolades

Home media
The original American VHS release by RCA/Columbia Pictures Home Video for video rental in 1986 featured a pan-and-scan version of the film and was packaged in a paper cover, which featured the poster artwork and sealed with a flap. This release was subsequently followed by a bargain copy that sported a photo of Evil Ed on the front cover.

The film was issued by Columbia/TriStar Home Video on DVD in 1999. This release included a double-sided DVD, which featured the widescreen version of the film on one side, a pan and scan version on the other, and the theatrical trailer on both. Included was a pamphlet with the poster art, five photos, scene selections, and a brief text interview with visual-effects art director John Bruno. The DVD was later issued by Sony Pictures Home Entertainment; this release is missing the pamphlet and bears a different company logo, but is otherwise identical to the previous DVD. In 2008, the film was paired on DVD with Urban Legend, and in 2013, it was issued again as part of the 4 Movie Thrills & Chills Collection, Volume 3 release alongside: The Craft, Monster High, and Brainscan.

On December 13, 2011, the film was released on Blu-ray by Twilight Time in an edition limited to 3,000 copies. This release includes two theatrical trailers, an isolated music score, and a four-page booklet containing an essay on the film as special features.

On January 20, 2015, Twilight Time re-released the film on Blu-ray as a 30th-Anniversary Edition, limited to 5,000 copies. The Blu-ray has gone out of print and has been a sought-after collector's item.

On February 12, 2019, Sony Pictures themselves re-released the film again on Blu-ray containing a new 4K remaster, which also included the remixed 5.1 audio and the original stereo mix. While it does exclude the isolated score, the booklet, and a few other special features, it also adds a few new special features not available on either of the Twilight Time releases. 

On October 4, 2022, Sony Pictures released the film on Ultra HD 4K Blu-ray on Steelbook format for the first time. The disc includes the film in a Dolby Atmos audio track, the previous 5.1 track, the original stereo mix, Dolby Vision HDR, and over 13 hours of existing and new special features.

Documentary film
Chris Griffiths directed, along with producer Gary Smart, the 2016 documentary film You're So Cool Brewster! The Story of Fright Night.

Sequels

After the critical and financial success of Fright Night, producer Herb Jaffe retained the screen rights to the characters and pushed for a sequel to be made. Although he was unhappy that the budget was drastically slashed, Holland was interested, but Sarandon and he were both tied up making Child's Play, and could not commit to the film, though director Tommy Lee Wallace sought out Holland for advice and Sarandon visited the set while they were shooting. Stephen Geoffreys was approached to reprise the role of Evil Ed, but he did not like the script and he was offered the lead in 976-EVIL, which was scheduled to shoot at the same time, so he opted to take that part, instead. Bearse read an early draft of the script that included the Amy character, but she was busy with her TV series Married... with Children, so a new girlfriend (portrayed by Traci Lind) was written for Charley Brewster. In the end, only Ragsdale and McDowall reprised their roles, and a new set of villains was devised.

Direct sequel
From all accounts, McDowall relished playing Peter Vincent and was eager to bring Holland back to the franchise, so he had set up a meeting for Holland and himself with Carolco Pictures chairman Jose Menendez to discuss making Fright Night Part 3. Unfortunately, before that meeting could occur, Menendez and his wife were infamously murdered by their sons, Lyle and Erik. Not only did this stop another sequel, but it also interfered with the release of Fright Night Part 2, which attained extremely limited theatrical distribution before being dumped on home video by Carolco's subsidiary, Live Entertainment.

In January 2017, Tom Holland announced that he was writing a Fright Night 3 novel, noting that by 2019 he would obtain the rights to the franchise; after which he plans to develop a third movie.

In October 2020, Tom Holland confirmed that he is writing a direct-sequel to the original Fright Night, with the working title of Fright Night: Resurrection. The plot will more directly follow the first film, and not incorporate elements from the previous sequel. Holland confirmed the return of original characters stating: "I'm bringing back everybody I can. I'm calling it Resurrection because we've got to resurrect Billy Cole and Jerry Dandridge." Holland went on to say "Part of the issue with the attempts at sequels and remakes is that the movie itself was kind of a singular idea, and a follow-up needed to be more than just set in the same world -- it needed to draw from the same set of inspirations and follow a similar thematic thread."

Remake
In May 2009, DreamWorks first announced that it would be overseeing a remake of Fright Night, which came to fruition and was released in 2011 with the same title: Fright Night. The script, penned by Buffy the Vampire Slayer alumna Marti Noxon, loosely followed the plot of the original film. Charley (Anton Yelchin) and his mother (Toni Collette) are transplanted from Corvalis, Iowa, to a Las Vegas suburb; Amy (Imogen Poots) is feistier and sexually aggressive; Evil Ed (Christopher Mintz-Plasse) has endured a falling out with Charley prior to the start of the film; Peter Vincent (David Tennant) is a horror magician modeled after Criss Angel; the Billy Cole character was omitted; and Jerry Dandrige (Colin Farrell) is no longer the lovelorn vampire. He was described by Evil Ed as "the fucking shark from Jaws" and has different intentions for his victims.

Sarandon was offered a role in the 2011 remake and chose to pass on the torch by doing a cameo as a man who is eaten by Jerry Dandrige. Sarandon pointed out, "It's not the original and they didn't set out to make the original", but the cast and crew of the remake "were all huge fans." Farrell had watched the film countless times during his youth, and publicly stated, "I heard they were remaking Fright Night and went, "Ah, god, remake! Hollywood, so dull! And I read the script and really hoped I didn't like it, and I did." Recalled Sarandon of his first encounter with Farrell, "He walked in and he literally was almost shaking, he was so excited at the prospect of meeting his childhood idol. He gave me a beautiful bottle of wine and a DVD set of the Carl Dreyer Vampyr. It was a really graceful and wonderful introduction."

During a reunion panel discussion at Monsterpalooza in 2012, the cast of the original film discussed the remake at length. Bearse commented, "as a stand-alone horror movie, it was very well done. It didn't lessen the appeal of the original. It was just more of a one-note film." Geoffreys only watched the first 20 minutes and then turned it off. Stark and Ragsdale went to a screening and discovered they "were the only two people" in attendance. Ragsdale liked an early draft of the screenplay, but he was not particularly enamored with the final result and was perplexed that "there was kind of a nastiness to" the Evil Ed character. The discussion dragged on for so long that the audience roared with laughter when Sarandon sarcastically interrupted Ragsdale to declare, "I'm sure there are some other questions about the original Fright Night."

When asked his thoughts in 2015, creator Tom Holland replied, "Kudos to them on every level for their professionalism, but they forgot the humor and the heart. They should have called it something other than Fright Night, because it had no more than a passing resemblance to the original. What they did to Jerry Dandrige and Peter Vincent was criminal." Smiling, he added, "Outside of that, it was wonderful."

In other media

Comic books
Between 1988 and 1993, NOW Comics published 27 Fright Night comic books. The original film was adapted as the first two issues of the series, Fright Night Part 2 was adapted as a stand-alone graphic novel (which was not canonical with the series), and the rest of the issues consisted of original stories following the further exploits of Peter Vincent and Charley Brewster, who teamed up to battle a vast array of vampires and monsters. Amy Peterson and Billy Cole only appeared in the first two issues, but Evil Ed returned to become a constant foil, and Jerry Dandrige was ultimately resurrected and had just begun to amass an army of Parisian vampire prostitutes when Now Comics filed for bankruptcy. Production halted in 1990 with issue #22, leaving the story incomplete. After corporate restructuring, four 3-D special issues were released between 1992 and 1993. Three of these releases were reprints of stories from the regular series while the fourth featured a previously unpublished story.

In 2018, Tom Holland announced a new comic series called Tom Holland's Fright Night: The Peter Vincent Chronicles.

Novelizations
Tor Books published a novelization, Fright Night, by Craig Spector and John Skipp in 1985. Working from Holland's screenplay, Skipp and Spector only had a month to write the book, so it could be published to coincide with the release of the film. The book follows the story of the film, but includes additional details about the characters and their relationships. The novel has been out of print for decades, and resale prices wildly vary.

Fright Night: Origins, a new novelization of the film written by Tom Holland and Jack Ulrich, was released on September 8, 2022. The novel is the first book in a planned trilogy of books that will expand the Fright Night universe.

Video game
Fright Night, an arcade-style computer game was released by Microdeal in 1988 for Amiga computers. In the game, players assume the role of Jerry Dandrige as he attempts to turn his victims into vampires before sunrise.

Stage
The official stage adaptation of Fright Night celebrated its world premiere at Carnegie Stage in Pittsburgh, Pennsylvania, on October 5, 2018. It was written and directed by James Michael Shoberg and produced by the Rage of the Stage Players. The original cast included Dan Finkel as Charley Brewster, Elena Cristina Lázaro as Amy Petersen, Greg Crawford as Peter Vincent, Ryan Ott as Billy Cole, Brian Ceponis as Jerry Dandrige, Amanda Anne Leight as Judy Brewster, Corey Shaffer as "Evil" Ed Thompson, Dave Joseph as Lieutenant Detective Lennox, Ryan Frank as Donny, and Edward Bates as Leon.

Foreign market
In 1989, the film was unofficially remade in India as Kalpana House. Set at Christmastime, this version mirrors the original film, but the Peter Vincent character's occupation was changed to a priest, a few additional characters and scenes were added, and it includes several Bollywood-like musical numbers. The dialogue and credits are primarily in Malayalam, but all of the actors casually drift in and out of English.

See also

 Vampire film

References

External links

 
 
 
 
 
 
 
 Two free downloadable commentary tracks, courtesy of Icons of Fright.

1985 films
1985 horror films
1985 independent films
American independent films
Columbia Pictures films
1980s English-language films
Films adapted into comics
Films directed by Tom Holland
Films scored by Brad Fiedel
Films shot in Los Angeles
Fright Night (franchise)
American vampire films
American supernatural horror films
1985 directorial debut films
1980s teen horror films
American teen horror films
1980s American films